Navin Chandra Barot (1924-1 August 2002) was an Indian politician and member of the Rashtriya Majdoor Paksha. Barot was a first term member of the Gujarat Legislative Assembly in 1975 from the  Maninagar constituency in Eastern side of city Amdavad. He served as a labour minister in Gujarat in the ministry of Babubhai J Patel who belonged to the Janata Party government.

References 

Politicians from Ahmedabad
Bharatiya Jana Sangh politicians
Akhil Bharatiya Ram Rajya Parishad politicians
Gujarat MLAs 1975–1980
2002 deaths
1924 births
Janata Party politicians